Philip Andrew Collins (born March 8, 1967) is an American politician who was the Prohibition Party's presidential nominee for the 2020 presidential election. Collins was active in local politics in Illinois and Nevada.

Early life
Philip Andrew Collins was born on March 8, 1967, at Naval Construction Battalion Center Port Hueneme, California, where his father was stationed. In 1985, he graduated from Siloam Springs High School and later received a Bachelor of Arts in political science from the University of Arkansas. Collins served in the United States Navy and was a hospital corpsman.

Career

Local politics

During the 2012 and 2014 House of Representatives elections Collins ran as a write-in candidate in the seventh and ninth congressional districts. During the 2012 Republican Party presidential primaries he supported former Louisiana Governor Buddy Roemer and ran as a pro-Roemer delegate in the primary.

From May 2013 to January 2016, he served as a Libertyville Township trustee and while living in Illinois served as the chairman of the Illinois Prohibition party. In 2017, he ran for a position on the Harper College Board of Trustees and placed second in the election for two seats, but declined to take office, since he had moved to Las Vegas, Nevada, after the last day to file a withdrawal of candidacy.

On June 12, 2018, he won the Republican nomination for Clark County treasurer against Ron Q. Quiland, but was defeated in the general election by Laura Fitzpatrick. He later ran in Las Vegas' 2019 mayoral election where he came in second place.

Presidential

On April 14, 2019, he was given the Prohibition Party's vice presidential nomination after initially losing the presidential nomination to Connie Gammon, who was the original 2020 vice presidential nominee after Bill Bayes withdrew from the presidential nomination. On August 24, 2019, he was given the Prohibition Party's presidential nomination to replace Connie Gammon after Gammon withdrew due to health problems. Afterward he announced that he would also run in the American Independent Party's presidential primary in California and his name was included on the American Independent primary list.

On March 3, 2020, he won the American Independent primary in California. However, the American Independent Party elected to give its presidential nomination to Rocky De La Fuente and its vice presidential nomination to Kanye West.

Personal life
Collins is a Lutheran Christian, being a communicant of the Orthodox Lutheran Confessional Conference.

Electoral history

References

External links
 

1967 births
21st-century American politicians
Candidates in the 2020 United States presidential election
Illinois city council members
Illinois Republicans
Illinois Prohibitionists
Living people
Military personnel from California
Nevada Republicans
Nevada Prohibitionists
People from Port Hueneme, California
People from Libertyville, Illinois
Prohibition Party (United States) presidential nominees
University of Arkansas alumni